Here Comes John Allan Cameron is the debut album from Canadian singer/songwriter John Allan Cameron.  It was recorded at the RCA recording studios in Montreal, Quebec, using the same studio John Lennon used to record Give Peace A Chance.  The album is notable as being the first professional multi-track recording by a Cape Breton artist.  The album helped launch Cameron's career abroad, leading to performances at the Newport Folk Festival and Mariposa Folk Festival.

Track listing
"There Was An Old Woman From Mabou"
"The Banks Of Sicily"
"Air Fal Al Al O"
"Medley - Scots Guards Farewell to South Africa, Macneil of Ugadale, Bonawe Highlanders"
"Medley - Mrs Hamilton Of Pencaitland, Jean MacKenzie, The Mabou Jig, Mrs Ronald MacDonald"
"The Four Marys"
"Medley - Ballindalloch Castle, The Atholl Highlanders, Farewell To The Creeks"
"Medley - Fear An Dhuin Mhois, Null Thar Nan Eileanan, Sleepy Maggie"
"Medley - Lamentation for James Moray of Abercarney, Dr. MacDonald's Compliments to Mr. James Scott Skinner, Joe MacInnis"
"Peggy Gordon"
"I Am A Little Beggarman"

Personnel
John Allan Cameron - Vocals, guitars and step dancing
Jessie Cameron - Piano and celeste
John Donald Cameron - Fiddle
Freddie McKenna - Bass
Donald Gordon - Gaelic vocals on "Air Fal Al Al O"

Re-issue
The album was re-mastered in 2012 using the original multi-track session tapes, because the original stereo master could not be found. The re-issue includes a 28-page booklet, featuring the original liner notes and artwork, along with additional photos and writings.

Richard L. Hess - Tape Transfers
Paul MacDonald - Audio Restoration
Stuart Cameron, Allie Bennett, Paul MacDonald - Editing
Jamie Foulds, Soundpark Studios - Mixing and Mastering
Stephen MacDonald - Project Director
Stuart Cameron - Executive Producer
Paul MacDonald - Research and Liner Notes

Citations

1969 debut albums